The 2000 Miami Hurricanes football team represented the University of Miami during the 2000 NCAA Division I-A football season. It was the Hurricanes' 75th season of football and tenth as a member of the Big East Conference. The Hurricanes were led by sixth-year head coach Butch Davis and played their home games at the Orange Bowl. They finished the season 11–1 overall and 7–0 in the Big East to finish as conference champion. They were invited to the Sugar Bowl where they defeated Florida, 37–20.

Schedule

Roster

Rankings

Season summary
The 2000 University of Miami Hurricanes football season added to the legendary and controversial lore of one of the most hated and celebrated teams in NCAA college Football history. This was widely considered the best University of Miami football team not to compete in a national championship game. The 2000 Season returned the Hurricanes to elite college football status after being penalized with NCAA scholarship restrictions due to the results of NCAA violations from the Jimmy Johnson-Dennis Erickson eras. The 2000 Miami team was coached by Butch Davis, who returned to Miami in the 1995 season after coaching the defensive line and as Defensive Coordinator of the Dallas Cowboys. Davis was also a one time assistant coach under Jimmy Johnson at Miami.

McNeese State

at Washington

    
    
    
    
    
    
    
    
    
    

The lowest-point of the season was the second game loss at the Washington Huskies. This was the game that ultimately cost  Miami a chance to play in the BCS National championship game.

at West Virginia

at Rutgers

Florida State

Memorable games in the 2000 season included beating top ranked FSU for the first time since 1994 in the "Wide Right 2" game. In the game, FSU had a chance to tie the game on last second field goal. Miami CB Mike Rumph sprinted off the line untouched and came within 1 foot of blocking the kick, causing the FSU kicker to adjust and kicking the field goal "Wide Right". This was the third game in the Miami/FSU rivalry where FSU had missed a game ending field goal "Wide Right".  Up to this point, this was the most important win in the Butch Davis-coached Miami U teams, proving that Miami could beat a #1 ranked team again.

Louisiana Tech

Virginia Tech

Another highlight of the 2000 season was beating second-ranked Virginia Tech, led by an injured Michael Vick.

vs. Florida (Sugar Bowl)

The 2000 Miami Hurricance finished the season by soundly beating the University of Florida Gators in the Sugar Bowl in New Orleans.

Controversies
Despite beating the Number 1/2 ranked football teams during the 2000 season and losing only 1 game, the BCS computer model (which chose the two finalist for the NCAA college football season) chose FSU ahead of University of Miami to play in the National Championship game. The BCS computer model differential computation was partially based on Washington Huskies final ranking and amount of loss point differential, despite Miami beating FSU. Most college football pundits felt the BCS model was wrong since 1-loss Washington beat Miami who beat FSU. This season was one of the deciding factors in ultimately doing away with the BCS computer only model for choosing the National Championship teams.

However, a comparison of the teams that FSU played and defeated versus who Miami played and defeated clearly showed that FSU had the stronger schedule and was the better team at the end of the year. FSU defeated #21 NC State 58-14, #10 Clemson 54-7 and #4 Florida 30-7. Florida was the only common opponent for FSU and Miami. FSU beat the Gators by 23 points and held them to 7 points while Miami beat them by 17 points but gave up 20 points. Miami played McNeese State, Rutgers, Temple, Louisiana Tech and other than that over-ranked #2 Virginia Tech team, none of the other teams Miami defeated on their schedule had more than 7 wins. On the other hand, FSU defeated Georgia Tech (9 wins), Louisville (9 wins), NC State (8 wins), Clemson (9 wins) and Florida (10 wins).

During the week of the Sugar Bowl, University of Miami and University of Florida Football teams engaged in an infamous street fight in New Orleans, dubbed the "Bourbon Street Brawl", which was the end result of several Florida players engaging in trash talk with University of Miami DB Al Blades at a night club. The argument spilled out onto the street with several University of Miami players leaving other bars to support Blades including hulking 300 pound plus freshmen Vince Wilfork, Bryant McKinnie, and Jonathan Vilma. Up to 25 players engaged in a street brawl on Bourbon Street with the New Orleans Police being called to break up the fight. Several University of Florida football players showed signs of the fight with bruises on their faces in PR leading up to the game. No arrests were made.

After the Sugar bowl, head coach Butch Davis accepted the head coaching position for the NFL Cleveland Browns. This was a shock to the entire University Miami program as Davis had told the team and 2001 recruits that he would be returning to the team.

With their core 2000 roster intact, including Heisman candidates Ken Dorsey and Clinton Portis, Miami would start the 2001 season ranked Number 1. The 2000 team was featured in the ESPN 30 for 30 documentaries, "U part 2," and in, "U Reloaded".

References

Miami
Miami Hurricanes football seasons
Big East Conference football champion seasons
Lambert-Meadowlands Trophy seasons
Miami Hurricanes football